India Fashion Week is a bi-annual fashion week organized and promoted by the Fashion Design Council of India. It was sponsored by Wills Lifestyle from 2006–2014 before Amazon.in became the sponsor.

The first event in 2000 featured the work of 33 designers. There were also over thirty presenters at the Spring Fashion Week in March 2013.

In 2010, fire permits were not secured in time for the first day events which caused an extra day to be added to accommodate the presentations that had been cancelled on the first day.

The WIFW autumn-winter 2014 started on 26 March 2014 with actress Shilpa Shetty walking the ramp wearing the collections of designer Tarun Tahiliani. The WIFW spring-summer 2015 event started on 8 October 2014 at New Delhi.

The Indian fashion industry has become a growing industry with international events such as the India Fashion Week and annual shows by fashion designers being held across major cities of the country.

See also
Bangalore Fashion Week
Lakme Fashion Week
India Runway Week

References

New Delhi
Fashion events in India
Annual events in India
Culture of Delhi
Recurring events established in 2000
Fashion weeks